Pencoed is a town and community in the county borough of Bridgend, Wales. It straddles the M4 motorway north east of Bridgend and is situated on the Ewenny River. At the 2011 census it had a population of around 9,166.

Early habitation
The earliest evidence of habitation in the area is the nearby Ogof y Pebyll ("Tents Cave") or Ogof Coed-y-Mwstwr ("Hubbub Wood Cave")),(Grid Ref: SS951807) which is a scheduled monument and appears to have been inhabited during Neolithic or Bronze Age periods. Worked flint flakes have been found, along with the teeth of numerous mammals of many different species.

Spelling, pronunciation and etymology
In Welsh, the correct spelling is Pen-coed. Often, in English, spellings now superseded in the Welsh language are used as the official name (i.e. spellings regarded as obsolete since the publication of Rhestr o Enwau Lleoedd / A Gazetteer of Welsh Place-Names in 1967).

Thus "Pencoed", without a hyphen, is usually used in English, but is considered misleading in Welsh as it suggests that "pen" bears the stress rather than "coed" (the hyphen shows that the stress falls on the final syllable). The spelling "Pencoed", when used in Welsh, is considered to be, strictly speaking, incorrect.

The basis of the name is "pen y coed" ("head, top, end (of) the forest"). The linking definite article (y) is often lost in place names, hence places called Pen-y-coed as well as the shorter Pen-coed.

There are various pronunciations of the name to be heard.

The diphthong 'oe' in a monosyllable is generally reduced to a long vowel 'o' [o:] in South Wales, and so the pronunciation of the town has traditionally been . This local form is spelt as "Pen-côd" in texts written in the Gwentian dialect (that is, south-eastern Welsh).

One pronunciation used in English is an approximation of the standard Welsh form but with stress shift  . A poor pronunciation in English heard from outsiders and often on the English media is a spelling pronunciation as if the name were in English orthography –  
  (as if the second element were "co-ed", the short form of the adjective "co-educational").

Local signage shows the use of the two forms (Pen-coed, Pencoed) in English contexts but also in Welsh contexts, with Pencoed predominating. Thus one sees Pencoed Primary School in English, and Ysgol Gynradd Pencoed in Welsh, on the sign on the school façade. The library sign reads Pencoed Library and Llyfrgell Pencoed. The railway station sign has Pencoed. Roadsigns show Pencoed Cemetery and Mynwent Pencoed. However, other signs are Pen-coed Technology Park and Parc Technoleg Pen-coed, and the roadsign on Heol Pen-y-bont / Penybont Road at the entrance to the village half a mile from the centre shows "Pen-coed ½", whereas a sign just across the road indicating the entrance to the village has Pencoed.

Present town
Pencoed as a town developed in the late 19th century, around the coal mining industry; the coal mines have now closed.

The town is in the Ewenny Valley and is divided by the M4 motorway near Junction 35, although almost all of the town lies to the north of the M4. About two miles north of the town, the upland relief of the South Wales Valleys starts. To the south are the rolling countryside of the Vale of Glamorgan and the rugged north coast of the Bristol Channel.

The town consists of three distinct areas, which were once four small hamlets. To the north is Penprysg ("copse end"), which lies at the end of the low ridge (100 m) of Cefn Hirgoed ("long wood ridge"). To the west is Hendre ("lowland winter homestead", literally "old settlement") which rises gently from the railway line in the centre of the town towards the common land at Ystadwaun, on older maps as Ystad y Waun and Gwastadwaun ("level moor"). The central and eastern part of the town, which lies on the valley floor near the railway, consists of Pencoed itself and Felindre ("mill settlement"). There are numerous streams rising and running through the town, and two main rivers, the Ewenni Fawr (Great Ewenny) and the Ewenni Fach (Little Ewenny). At the centre of the town, close to the station, is the war memorial (known locally as the Monument), the shopping centre and the local Community Hall (Pencoed Miners' Welfare Hall). The town is well provided with sports facilities, schools, pubs and clubs. A new development, Earlswood Parc, was announced in 2002 and now has been completed, incorporating various Westbury built homes and Bocam business park.

The current mayor is Councillor Bridie Sedgebeer.

Pencoed hosted the National Eisteddfod in 1998.

The Raspberry Pi single-board computer is manufactured at the Sony Technology Centre in Pencoed, which produces 44,000 every week.

Twinning
Pencoed has twinning arrangements with:
  Waldsassen, Germany
  Plouzané, France

References

External links
Pencoed Town Council website
www.geograph.co.uk : photos of Pencoed and surrounding area
2426 (Pencoed) Squadron - Air Training Corp

 
Towns in Bridgend County Borough
Communities in Bridgend County Borough